Shirin Bolagh (also Romanized as Shīrīn Bolāgh) is a village in Hajjilar-e Shomali Rural District of Hajjilar District of Chaypareh County, West Azerbaijan province, Iran. At the 2006 National Census, its population (as a village in the former Chaypareh District of Khoy County) was 591 in 101 households. The following census in 2011 counted 636 people in 133 households, by which time the district was separated from the county, established as Chaypareh County, and divided into two districts. The latest census in 2016 showed a population of 653 people in 148 households; it was the largest village in its rural district.

References 

Chaypareh County

Populated places in West Azerbaijan Province

Populated places in Chaypareh County